Mount Mitchell, known in Cherokee as Attakulla, is the highest peak of the Appalachian Mountains and the highest peak in mainland North America east of the Mississippi River. It is protected by Mount Mitchell State Park and surrounded by the Pisgah National Forest.

Geography

The peak is the highest mountain in the United States east of the Mississippi River, and the highest in all of eastern North America south of the Arctic Cordillera. The nearest higher peaks are in the Black Hills of South Dakota and the highland foothills of Colorado. The mountain's topographic isolation is calculated from the nearest discernible single higher point: Lone Butte, which is 1,189 miles (1,913 km) away in southeastern Colorado.

History
The Cherokee people, who long occupied this area as part of their homeland, called the mountain Attakulla. European-American settlers first called the mountain Black Dome for its rounded shape. They later named it after Elisha Mitchell, a professor at the University of North Carolina, who first explored the Black Mountain region in 1835. He determined that the height of the range exceeded by several hundred feet that of Mount Washington in New Hampshire. The latter had been commonly thought at the time to be the highest point in the United States east of the Rocky Mountains. Mitchell fell to his death at nearby Mitchell Falls in 1857, where he had returned to verify his earlier measurements.

A  road (NC 128) connects the scenic Blue Ridge Parkway to a parking lot where a steep paved  trail leads through a conifer forest to the summit. The  stone observation tower on the summit was torn down in late 2006. A new observation deck was constructed and opened to visitors in January 2009.

Description
Mount Mitchell was formed during the Precambrian when marine deposits were metamorphosed into gneiss and schist. These metasedimentary rocks were later uplifted during the Alleghenian orogeny. The soils are well drained, dark brown and stony with fine-earth material ranging in texture from sandy clay loam to loam or sandy loam; Burton and Craggey are the most common series around the summit.

Environment

The mountain's summit is coated in a dense stand of Southern Appalachian spruce-fir forest, which consists primarily of two evergreen species—the red spruce and the Fraser fir.  Most of the mature Fraser firs, however, were killed off by the non-native Balsam woolly adelgid in the latter half of the 20th century. The high elevations expose plant life to high levels of pollution, including acid precipitation in the form of rain, snow, and fog. These acids damage the red spruce trees in part by releasing natural metals from the soil, such as aluminum, and by leaching important minerals.  To what extent this pollution harms the high-altitude ecosystem is debatable.

While the mountain is still mostly lush and green in the summer, many dead Fraser fir trunks can be seen due to these serious problems. Reducing air pollution is a difficult issue, as the pollutants are often carried by air to this area from long distances. Sources can be local or hundreds of miles away, requiring cooperation from as far away as the Midwest.

Wildflowers are abundant all summer long. Young fir and spruce trees do well in the subalpine climate, and their cones feed the birds along with wild blueberry and blackberry shrubs.

Climate

See also

List of mountains in North Carolina
Mountains-to-Sea Trail
Assault on Mount Mitchell, bicycling endurance

References

External links

 Mount Mitchell State Park
Mount Mitchell Current Weather Conditions

Appalachian culture in North Carolina
Blue Ridge Mountains
Blue Ridge National Heritage Area
Mitchell
Landmarks in North Carolina
Mitchell
National Natural Landmarks in North Carolina
North American 2000 m summits
Mountains of Yancey County, North Carolina
Mitchell
Western North Carolina